Mueang Yang is a subdistrict (Tambon) in the Mueang Yang district of Nakhon Ratchasima Province, Thailand. The whole area of the subdistrict is covered by the subdistrict municipality (Thesaban Tambon) of Mueang Yang (เทศบาลตำบลเมืองยาง). The subdistrict administrative organization (SAO) of Mueang Yang was created in 1996.

Tambon of Nakhon Ratchasima Province
Thesaban of Nakhon Ratchasima Province